

S

Notes
  SAO is common IATA code for São Paulo–Guarulhos International Airport , São Paulo–Congonhas Airport  and Viracopos/Campinas International Airport .
  SDZ is common IATA code for Sumburgh Airport , Tingwall Airport  and Scatsta Airport .
  SEL is common IATA code for Incheon International Airport , Gimpo International Airport  and Seoul Air Base .
  SFY is common IATA code for Bradley International Airport  and Westover Metropolitan Airport .
  SPK is common IATA code for New Chitose Airport  and Okadama Airport .
  STO is common IATA code for Stockholm Arlanda Airport , Stockholm Bromma Airport , Stockholm Skavsta Airport  and Stockholm Västerås Airport .
  Airport is located in the Subang, Selangor state.

References

  – includes IATA codes
 
 Aviation Safety Network – IATA and ICAO airport codes
 Great Circle Mapper – IATA, ICAO and FAA airport codes

S